WOW Hits 2007 is a two-disc compilation album of songs that represent the best of Christian music of 2006.  It was released on October 3, 2006.

Track listing

Charts

Weekly charts

Year-end charts

References

External links
 WOW Hits official website
 Find all the WOW HITS
 Amazon.com. Retrieved on March 21, 2007.

2006 compilation albums
2007